This is a List of B-1 Units of the United States Air Force by wing, squadron, location, features, variant, and service dates.  During the 1980s, squadrons were transferred regularly to different wings and bases temporarily, and sometimes permanently.

Active duty

References

External links

1980s United States bomber aircraft
United States military aircraft
Military units and formations of the United States Air Force by equipment